Ufacıkören is a village in the District of İmamoğlu, Adana Province, Turkey.

References

Villages in İmamoğlu District